Valerie Nurr'araaluk Davidson (born May 19, 1967) is an American politician who briefly served as the 13th lieutenant governor of Alaska, from October to December 2018. She was sworn in after Byron Mallott's abrupt resignation from the post on October 16, 2018. In April 2020, Davidson became the 12th president of Alaska Pacific University. She is the first woman to serve as president of the university. In March 2021, Davidson became interim president of Alaska Native Tribal Health Consortium.

Early and personal life
Davidson was born in Bethel, Alaska. Her mother is Yup'ik, and her father is originally from Port Orchard, Washington. She grew up both in Bethel and the nearby Aniak. Davidson is an enrolled tribal member of the Orutsararmiut Native Council.

In 1992, Davidson graduated from University of Alaska Southeast with a Bachelor of Education. Davidson also holds a degree in law from the University of New Mexico, obtained in 1998. After she graduated, she worked as a lawyer for the Alaska Native Tribal Health Consortium.

Career
Davidson has previously served as Senior Director of Legal & Intergovernmental Affairs for the Alaska Native Tribal Health Consortium, and as Chair of the Tribal Technical Advisory Group to the Centers for Medicare and Medicaid Services for ten years. Part of her work there included getting veterans in rural areas access to healthcare through tribal clinics, and creating rural dental clinic programs employing mid-level dental professionals to improve access to dental care.

In December 2014, Davidson was appointed Commissioner of the Alaska Department of Health and Social Services. During her tenure there, she worked on Alaska's Medicaid expansion alongside Governor Walker.

On October 16, 2018, Davidson was sworn in as lieutenant governor after an emergency cabinet meeting in the wake of Byron Mallott's resignation. She is Alaska’s first female Alaska Native lieutenant governor. Upon being sworn in, she briefly became the running mate of incumbent Governor Bill Walker in his 2018 re-election campaign before he dropped out of the race on October 19.

In April 2020, Davidson became the 12th president of Alaska Pacific University. She is the first woman to serve as president of the university.

See also 
 List of minority governors and lieutenant governors in the United States

Notes

References

External links
 

1967 births
21st-century American politicians
21st-century American women politicians
Alaska Democrats
Alaska lawyers
Alaska Independents
Inuit politicians
Lieutenant Governors of Alaska
Living people
People from Bethel, Alaska
University of Alaska Southeast alumni
University of New Mexico alumni
Women state constitutional officers of Alaska
Yupik people